Harshabashpam is a 1977 Indian Malayalam film, directed by P. Gopikumar and produced by K. H. Khan Sahib. The film stars K. J. Yesudas, Adoor Bhasi, Bahadoor and Janardanan in the lead roles. The film has musical score by M. K. Arjunan.

Cast
K. J. Yesudas
Adoor Bhasi
Bahadoor
Janardanan
K. P. Ummer
M. G. Soman
Mallika Sukumaran
Vidhubala

Soundtrack
The music was composed by M. K. Arjunan and the lyrics were written by K. H. Khan Sahib and Kanam E. J.

References

External links
 

1977 films
1970s Malayalam-language films
Films directed by P. Gopikumar